The first season of Black-ish aired from September 24, 2014, to May 20, 2015, on ABC in the United States. It was produced by Khalabo Ink Society, Wilmore Films, Cinema Gypsy Productions and Principato-Young Entertainment, with creator Kenya Barris, who also served as executive producer alongside Anthony Anderson, Brian Dobbins, Jonathan Groff and Helen Sugland.

The series revolves around Dre, portrayed by Anthony Anderson, a family man who struggles with finding his cultural identity while raising his kids in a white neighborhood. He lives with his wife, Bow (Tracee Ellis Ross) and his kids Zoey (Yara Shahidi), Andre Jr (Marcus Scribner), and twins Jack (Miles Brown) and Diane (Marsai Martin).

After only airing six episodes, ABC ordered a full season of 24 episodes. It was renewed for a second season on May 8, 2015.

The pilot episode premiered to a total of 11.04 million viewers, ranking number 1 in its time slot. It garnered 3.3/10 adults 18-49.


Cast

Main cast
 Anthony Anderson as Andre 'Dre' Johnson
 Tracee Ellis Ross as Rainbow 'Bow' Johnson
 Yara Shahidi as Zoey Johnson
 Marcus Scribner as Andre 'Junior' Johnson Jr.
 Miles Brown as Jack Johnson
 Marsai Martin as Diane Johnson

Recurring cast
 Laurence Fishburne as Earl "Pops" Johnson
 Jenifer Lewis as Ruby Johnson
 Peter Mackenzie as Leslie Stevens
 Jeff Meacham as Josh Oppenhol
 Deon Cole as Charlie Telphy
 Edi Patterson as Laura
 Allen Maldonado as Curtis
 Andre Carson as Zach
 Jennie Pierson as Ms. Davis

Guest cast
 Nicole Sullivan as Janine
 Ken Jenkins as Bernie
 Ana Ortiz as Angelica
 Richard Riehle as Solomon
 Julian de la Celle as Andre from Marseille
 Mindy Sterling as Pamela
 Beau Bridges as Paul
 Anna Deavere Smith as Alicia Johnson
 Jermaine Dupri as himself
 Maury Povich as himself
 Jerry Minor as Lance
 Lindsay Price as Maisie
 Mara Marini as Shawn
 Michael Rapaport as Jay Simmons
 Raven-Symoné as Rhonda Johnson
 Elle Young as Sharon
 Bill Maher as himself
 Mary J. Blige as Mirabelle
 Sean "Diddy" Combs as Elroy Savoy

Episodes

Reception

Ratings

Accolades

References

2014 American television seasons
2015 American television seasons
Black-ish